Tighearnach ua Cleirigh (died 916) was King of Uí Fiachrach Aidhne.

Sub anno 916, the Annals of the Four Masters states  Tighearnach ua Cleirigh, lord of Aidhne, died. He appears to have been a son of the previous king, Maelfabhaill mac Cleireach. His appellation was therefore not a surname, merely denoting he was the grandson of Cleireach. However, his descendants adopted the surname Ó Cléirigh, and all subsequent bearers of the name are believed to descend from him. Notables include:

Flann Ua Clerigh, fl. 952, apparently the first to use the surname. 
 Mac Comhaltan Ua Cleirigh,  King of Uí Fiachrach Aidhne, fl. 964.
Ruaidhrí mac Coscraigh, fl. 993
Mac Comhaltan Ua Cleirigh, fl. 998, alias Muireadhach?
Gilla Ceallaigh Ua Cleirigh, died 1003
 Lughaidh Ó Cléirigh  (fl. 1595–1630)
 Mícheál Ó Cléirigh (c. 1590–1643), considered the chief author of the chronicle of medieval Irish history known as the Annals of the Four Masters.
 Cú Choigcríche Ó Cléirigh (died 1664)

References
 Irish Kings and High-Kings, Francis John Byrne (2001), Dublin: Four Courts Press, 
 CELT: Corpus of Electronic Texts at University College Cork

External links
Ó Cléirigh ancestor search at Irish Times

People from County Galway
9th-century Irish monarchs
10th-century Irish monarchs
916 deaths
Year of birth unknown
Gaels